Anna Elisabeth Kjellberg (born 14 February 1984) is a Swedish Olympic sailor competing in match racing. She finished 12th in the Elliott 6m event at the 2012 Summer Olympics together with Malin Källström and Lotta Harrysson.She won the 2014 ISAF Women's Match Racing World Championship.

References

Swedish female sailors (sport)
Olympic sailors of Sweden
Elliott 6m class sailors
Royal Gothenburg Yacht Club sailors
Sailors at the 2012 Summer Olympics – Elliott 6m
1984 births
Living people
People from Lerum Municipality
Sportspeople from Västra Götaland County